Jimmy Suparno (born on February 20, 1984) is an Indonesian former footballer who played as a midfielder.

Career 
In January 2015, he signed with Persiram.

Honours

Club
PSCS Cilacap
 Indonesia Soccer Championship B: 2016

References

External links 
 

Indonesian footballers
Living people
1984 births
Persipura Jayapura players
Deltras F.C. players
Persijap Jepara players
Persela Lamongan players
Gresik United players
Arema F.C. players
Persiram Raja Ampat players
Liga 1 (Indonesia) players
Indonesian Premier Division players
Association football defenders
Association football midfielders
PSCS Cilacap players
Sportspeople from Cilacap Regency